Praying to the Aliens may refer to:
 "Praying to the Aliens", a Blue System song from the 1991 album Déjà Vu
 "Praying to the Aliens", a Gary Numan song from the 1979 Tubeway Army album Replicas
 Praying to the Aliens, Gary Numan's 1997 autobiography, coauthored by Steve Malins